Lestra is an indoor and outdoor bedding manufacturer based in Amboise, France. It was founded in Strasbourg, then in Germany, in 1914 by the Léopold family; its name is formed from Leopold and Strasbourg. It moved to Amboise at the start of World War II.

The company claims to be the leading producer of quilts and duvets in France, and the world's leading producer of extreme sleeping bags. It is based in Amboise and Beauvois-en-Cambrésis, France.

References

External links
 Corporate website

Manufacturing companies established in 1914
Camping equipment manufacturers
French brands
German companies established in 1914